Matheus Oliveira Santos (born 28 September 1997), known as Matheus Oliveira, is a Brazilian footballer who plays as an attacking midfielder for Mirassol-SP.

Club career

Santos
Born in São Paulo, Matheus joined Santos' youth setup in September 2013 at the age of 17, after starting it out at Audax. On 26 April 2016 he renewed his contract until 2019, and was promoted to the first team by manager Dorival Júnior in August.

Matheus made his unofficial first team debut on 8 October 2016, playing the last 30 minutes and assisting Fabián Noguera's goal in a 1–1 friendly draw against Benfica. His professional debut occurred the following 29 March, after he replaced Léo Cittadini in a 3–1 Campeonato Paulista home win against Grêmio Novorizontino.

Matheus made his Série A on 16 September 2017, again replacing Cittadini in a 2–0 away loss against Botafogo. On 6 January of the following year, he was loaned to Red Bull Brasil until the end of the year's Paulistão.

Matheus scored his first senior goal on 10 February 2018, netting the equalizer in a 1–1 away draw against São Caetano. On 25 April, he joined Série B side Guarani on loan until the end of the season, along with teammate Rafael Longuine.

Ponte Preta
On 10 January 2019, Matheus was loaned to Ponte Preta until 30 April, when his contract with Santos expires. After these two contracts ended, Matheus was free and signed a full contract with Ponte Preta.

Oeste
On 27 June 2019, after being released by Ponte, Matheus signed for Oeste.

Career statistics

References

External links
Santos FC profile 

1997 births
Living people
Footballers from São Paulo
Brazilian footballers
Association football midfielders
Campeonato Brasileiro Série A players
Campeonato Brasileiro Série B players
Santos FC players
Red Bull Brasil players
Guarani FC players
Associação Atlética Ponte Preta players
Oeste Futebol Clube players
Grêmio Esportivo Brasil players
Atlético Clube Goianiense players
Clube do Remo players